Artur Gavazzi (14 October 1861 – 12 March 1944) was a Croatian geographer and cartographer of Italian ancestry.

Gavazzi was born in Split (then in Austria-Hungary) and died in Zagreb (then in the Independent State of Croatia).

Gavazzi was the first professor of geography at the University of Ljubljana, where Anton Melik succeeded him. In 1928, Gavazzi went to the University of Zagreb.

External links
 
 Croatian Cartographers
 Croatian Geographic Society Portal - in Croatian
 Preface of the book "Croatian cartographers" by Ivka Kljajić (Croatian)

1861 births
1944 deaths
Academic staff of the University of Ljubljana
Academic staff of the University of Zagreb
Croatian cartographers
Italian geographers
Burials at Mirogoj Cemetery
Scientists from Split, Croatia